Minotaur Shock is the stage name of David Edwards, a Bristol-based electronica musician. His 2005 album Maritime was his first album released through 4AD Records, having previously released work via Manchester based Melodic. Edwards returned to Melodic for the release of his 2012 album, Orchard.

He also plays drums in Bronze Age Fox, a band from the Hanham area of Bristol. Since 2010, he has also released music under the stage name Principal Participant.

Discography

Albums
Chiff-Chaffs and Willow Warblers (2001)
Rinse (2003)
Maritime (2005)
Amateur Dramatics (2008)
Orchard (2012)
Music from 'The Noise''' (2014)MINO (2019)Salina Pulse Streams (2020)Chaff Probes (2021)

Albums as Principal ParticipantPrinciples (2010)Particles (2013)

Singles and EPsThe Bagatelle (2001)Motoring Britain (2001)Rockpoolin (2003)Vigo Bay (2005)Muesli (2005)Qi (2020)

CompilationsRinse'' (2002)

Remixes
 2000 2 Amigos - "The Great Freight Escape"
 2001 His Name Is Alive - "One Year"
 2002 Badly Drawn Boy - "Pissing in the Wind", "The Shining"
 2002 Normal Position - "Big Tits"
 2003 Hint - "Count Your Blessings"
 2003 Lucky Pierre - "The Heart of All That Is"
 2003 Mojave 3 - "Bluebird of Happiness"
 2004 Bloc Party - "Tulips"
 2004 Lunz - "Uferlose Sea"
 2004 Super Furry Animals - "Cityscape Skybaby"
 2005 Diefenbach - "Glorious"
 2005 The Longcut - "Transition"
 2005 Wolf & Cub - "Targets"
 2006 Hard-Fi - "Hard to Beat"
 2007 Stars - "The Big Fight"
 2009 Deastro - "Toxic Crusaders"

References

External links
Official website
Official MySpace Page

4AD artists
Sound
Musicians from Bristol
Living people
Year of birth missing (living people)